Sara Lund (born 1973) is a drummer from Washington State best known for drumming for the Olympia, Washington trio Unwound for a decade until their break up in 2002. Lund was playing for Witchypoo when she joined Unwound in 1992 after Brandt Sandeno, Unwound's original drummer, quit.

Lund started playing drums in school band and got her first drum set when she was fourteen. She has played drums in bands ever since. She is entirely self-taught other than school band. She has been called "one of the most unconventional, inventive, original drummers of the past twenty years."

Her setup is:
 1971 three-piece black oyster pearl Ludwig 12/15/22 with a Rogers Powertone snare
 Zildjian cymbals: 
14″ 1960s hi-hats
17″ K Dark Crash
18″ 1960s or ’70s crash
21″ 1960s ride
 Vader Manhattans 7A drumsticks

She also plays a number of different percussive instruments including "cowbell, Korean temple block, African agogo bells, ribbon crasher, Vibra-Slap, maracas, tambourine, cabasa, jingle bells, goat nails." She has also played drums for the Corin Tucker Band and the percussion ensemble Secret Drum Band.  She is currently a member of Nocturnal Habits and Hungry Ghost and teaches drumming lessons.

Personal life
Lund grew up in Indiana and moved to Olympia, Washington briefly as a child in the mid-1980s and then back again as an adult in 1991. She currently lives in Portland, Oregon. She has a master's degree in Library Science from the University of Washington and BA in Liberal Arts from The Evergreen State College. She has one son with Aaron Beam from Red Fang.

References

External links
 Personal site
 Unwound website

Living people
American women drummers
American rock drummers
1976 births
Musicians from Washington (state)
University of Washington Information School alumni
Evergreen State College alumni
Musicians from Portland, Oregon
21st-century American women